The Mighty Jungle is a Canadian puppet series created by Jeff Rosen and Jason Hopley.  The narrative of the story is largely crafted by a group of preschoolers who appear in live-action segments interspersed between puppet-acted scenes. It is co-produced by Halifax Film and Decode Entertainment, both DHX Media Companies (now as WildBrain), and produced in association with CBC Television. The series is broadcast in Canada on CBC Television, a Canadian television network owned by the Canadian Broadcasting Corporation, the national English-language public broadcaster, in the Kids' CBC programming block, and in the United States on Sprout.

Plot
Babu, along with his friends Bruce and Rhonda, explore many of the same issues that very young children face, such as wanting to win, feeling silly, or not knowing how much is "too much" of a good thing. As the story illustrating the day's theme is played out, the narrative occasionally pauses so that the live-action preschoolers can suggest a course of action for the puppet characters to take, and often the puppets will react to the advice they receive.

Characters
 Babu (performed by Frank Meschkuleit) is a meerkat who isn't scared of anything. 
 Bruce (performed by Mike Peterson) is a gorilla who is always nervous. He is always having fun with the help of his friends and his safety helmet.
 Rhonda (performed by Wendy Welch) is a rhinoceros that enjoys playing dress-up. She likes playing by the rules including the ones she makes up.

Cast
 Emilie-Claire Barlow as Cheryl

Puppeteers
 Jamie Bradley as Wendall the Sloth, Mr. Bristle the Warthog, Pizza Monkey, Steven the Elephant, Baby Kiko the Meerkat, Rainbow Unicorn, Dragon Dentist, Winter Wizard, Glinda the Stinky Flower, Eric the Baby Lion,  Chocolate Marshmallow Monkey, Magical Unicorn, Chucky the Cheetah, Friendly Octopus, Baby Dinosaur, River Pigs.
 Frank Meschkuleit as Babu the Meerkat
 Mike Petersen as Bruce the Gorilla
 Cheryl Wagner as Lala the Lion Cub
 Wendy Welch as Rhonda the Rhinoceros

Episodes

Season 1
 Planet Crazy
 Babysitting Kico 
 Tag that Sloth 
 The Magic Hat 
 The Ice Cream Castle 
Dress-Up Tea Party 
Babu's Missing Ball 
Watch That Egg! 
Bruce's First Sleepover
The Mighty Jungle Club
Bananas for Bananas 
Queen Rhonda 
 Spot the Giraffe 
 (It's Not Easy) Being Stinky
All That Sparkles 
Mighty Juice 
Jungle Picnic 
Jungle Snow Day 
Beehive Boogie 
Flower Picking Rules 
Jungle Campout 
Chocolate Marshmallow the Monkey 
Rhonda's Candy 
Wand-a-Rhonda 
 Rhonda's Birthday 
 Silly Day in the Jungle

Season 2
Babu and the Giant 
The Wishing Star 
Bruce's Surprise Party 
Rhonda's New Friend 
Bruce Loses His Helmet 
Friends for Life 
Mighty Jungle Safari
Babu and the Tooth Fairy 
Cindergorrila 
Mighty Jungle Time Machine
Space Pig 
Mighty Jungle Unicorn 
Mighty Jungle Parade 
Mighty Fast Babu 
Babu and the Itch 
Super Babu 
Under the Mighty Sea 
Rhonda's Makeover 
Monster Tea Party 
Mighty Banana Shortage

References

2000s Canadian children's television series
2000s preschool education television series
Canadian preschool education television series
CBC Kids original programming
Canadian television shows featuring puppetry
Television shows about apes
Fictional mongooses
Fictional rhinoceroses
Television series by DHX Media
English-language television shows